Anolis anisolepis, the Chiapas ornate anole, is a species of lizard in the family Dactyloidae. The species is found in Mexico.

References

Anoles
Endemic reptiles of Mexico
Reptiles described in 1968
Taxa named by Hobart Muir Smith
Taxa named by Thomas H. Fritts